Gabija Gedgaudaitė (born 13 July 2000) is a Lithuanian footballer who plays as a forward and has appeared for the Lithuania women's national team.

Career
Gedgaudaitė has been capped for the Lithuania national team, appearing for the team during the UEFA Women's Euro 2021 qualifying cycle.

References

External links
 
 

2000 births
Living people
Lithuanian women's footballers
Lithuania women's international footballers
Women's association football forwards